The Face on the Barroom Floor may refer to:

 "The Face on the Barroom Floor" (poem), an 1887 poem by Hugh Antoine d'Arcy
 The Face on the Bar Room Floor (1914 film), a film starring Charlie Chaplin, adapted from the poem
 The Face on the Bar-Room Floor (1923 film), a film directed by John Ford, adapted from the poem
 The Face on the Bar Room Floor (1932 film), a film directed by Bertram Bracken
 The Face on the Barroom Floor (painting), a 1936 painting on the floor of the Teller House Bar in Central City, Colorado, U.S., inspired by the poem
 The Face on the Barroom Floor (opera), an opera by Henry Mollicone, inspired by the painting
 "The Face on the Barroom Floor" (1946), a Nelson Algren story in The Neon Wilderness